Cellarful of Noise was a short lived 1980s rock and New Wave pop band featuring Mark Avsec and Kevin Valentine, both members of Donnie Iris and the Cruisers. They released two albums. They also had one song hit the Billboard Hot 100, "Samantha (What You Gonna Do?)," which peaked at #69 in April 1988.
They named themselves after Beatles  manager Brian Epstein's biography book of the same name.

Discography
 Cellarful of Noise (1985) 
 Magnificent Obsession (1988)

External links
[ Cellarful of Noise at allmusic]
Discography at Parallel Time

American rock music groups